Mary Help of Christians School may refer to:

 Republic of Ireland
Mary Help of Christians Girls National School (Dublin)

 Philippines
Mary Help of Christians School (Canlubang), Inc.

 United States
Mary Help of Christians Academy, North Haledon, New Jersey
Mary Help of Christians Catholic School, Parkland, Florida 
Mary Help of Christians School, Laredo, Texas